Dodonaea triquetra, known as common hop bush or large leaf hop bush, is a species of shrub occurring in eastern Australia.

Description
It grows as an erect shrub to 3 metres high. Leaves 5 to 12 cm long, 1 to 5 cm wide. Elliptic in shape, occasionally lanceolate or ovate. Flowers form on panicles. Seeds form on a winged capsule, 9 to 16 mm long.

Distribution and habitat
Growing in the forest understorey, in either wet or dry sclerophyll forest, often on sedimentary soils. Commonly seen in forest remnants in Sydney. Occurring in the states of Victoria, New South Wales and Queensland.

Uses 
Capsules used as a hop substitute by early settlers.

Dodonaea triquetra is cultivated as an ornamental plant for use in gardens and as a potted plant.

References

 Plant Net retrieved August 17, 2009 http://plantnet.rbgsyd.nsw.gov.au/cgi-bin/NSWfl.pl?page=nswfl&lvl=sp&name=Dodonaea~triquetra
 Definite Guide to Native Plants, Global Book Publishing

External links

triquetra
Flora of New South Wales
Flora of Queensland
Flora of Victoria (Australia)
Sapindales of Australia
Garden plants of Australasia
Shrubs